Steph Bowe (1 February 1994 – 20 January 2020) was an Australian novelist and blogger. She published three young adult novels between 2010 and 2017, while her blog, which she began at age 15, received about 12,000 hits per month.

Bowe was diagnosed with T-lymphoblastic lymphoma in April 2019, and died from the condition on 20 January 2020. She was 25 years old.

In February 2021 Text Publishing announced the Steph Bowe Mentorship for Young Writers. It is open to writers under 25 years of age and provides 20 hours of manuscript development assistance and writers' centre membership to the winner.

Bibliography 
Girl Saves Boy (2010)
All This Could End (2013)
Night Swimming (2017)

References

External links
Official website

Australian women writers
Australian writers
1994 births
2020 deaths
21st-century Australian women
21st-century Australian people